Joyce Evans is an American news anchor and reporter. She anchors WTXF's Fox 29 News at 6 and 10 p.m. on weekends. She joined the station in 1996 as a weekend anchor and general assignment reporter.

Career
Evans began her journalism career as the morning anchor at WSET in Lynchburg, Virginia, and later was a weekend anchor and public affairs program host in Miami, Florida, at WCIX (now WFOR). She moved to Philadelphia and for ten years worked at KYW-TV as a reporter, fill-in anchor and host of The Saturday Tribune.

On October 6, 2013, Evans posted a controversial tweet comparing a mass shooting to the popular TV drama Breaking Bad. In response to the controversy, Evans said that she did not mean to joke about a serious matter; she has not discussed it since.

Personal life
Born June 14, 1956, in Washington, D.C., the 5th child (of 8) of William A. and Margaret Evans, she attended Kenilworth Elementary, Grimke Elementary, Shaw Jr. High, and graduated from McKinley High School. Evans attended Howard University Upward Bound and is a graduate (Class of 1978) of Florida A&M University with a Bachelor of Science degree in journalism, and is a distinguished alumna. She is a member of the Delta Sigma Theta sorority, the National Association of Black Journalists and the Broadcast Pioneers of Philadelphia where in 2018, she was inducted into their hall of fame. She is a native of Washington, D.C., and resides in Philadelphia, Pennsylvania.

References 

http://www.fox29.com/about-us/6270098-story
http://sjgc.famu.edu/m/index.cfm/alumni-portal/distinguished-alumni/

Living people
African-American television personalities
Television anchors from Philadelphia
Florida A&M University alumni
People from Washington, D.C.
Year of birth missing (living people)
21st-century African-American people